Pooyappally  is a village in Kollam district in the state of Kerala, India.

Demographics
 India census, Pooyappally had a population of 23924 with 11399 males and 12525 females.

Transportation

Kerala State Road Transport Corporation bus services to nearby towns are available regularly Kollam-Kulathupuzha Limited stop chain service Every 20 min

References

Villages in Kollam district